Earth vs. The Radiators: the First 25 is a 2004 concert film by the New Orleans rock band, The Radiators.  Released in honor of the band's twenty-fifth anniversary, the film contains the complete performance from their January 31, 2004 concert at Tipitina's nightclub in New Orleans, and features guest appearances by a wide variety of other musicians.  Bonus features include backstage footage, band interviews, and excerpts from other concerts in their twenty-fifth anniversary series of shows.

A CD of the same name was also released, but it features an almost completely different set of songs.

Track listing
Set 1:

 "Monkey Meet" (Volker?)
 "Let's Radiate" (Ed Volker)
 "Last Getaway" (Volker)
 "Waiting for the Rain" (Volker)
 "Lila" (Volker)
 "Little Sadie" (traditional)
 "Confidential" (Volker)
 "Long Hard Journey Home" (Volker)
 "Jack O'Diamonds" (traditional)
 "Like Dreamers Do" (Volker)

Set 2:

 "Smoke and Dust" (Volker?)
 "Lovely You" (Volker)
 "Shake It Loose" (Volker?)
 "I Like It Like That" (Chris Kenner, Allen Toussaint)
 "Turtle Beach" (Volker)
 "Lost What They Had" (Volker)

Bonus Features
 The Radiators and Gregg Allman (features backstage footage and a joint performance of Allman's "Midnight Rider")
 Backstage with Karl Denson
 More Back Stage stuff
 The Radiators with Maceo Parker at B.B. King's, January 2, 2004
 Radiators Interview with Ken Dashow

External links
 Amazon.com page
 Yahoo! Movies listing for Earth vs. the Radiators
 RottenTomatoes.com listing for Earth vs. the Radiators

2004 films
Concert films
2000s English-language films